This page lists all the tours and matches played by Pakistan national field hockey team from 2010 to 2014. During this period Pakistan's most successful competition were the Asian Games (Champions: 2010) their first gold medal at the competition in 20 years. Asian Champions Trophy (Champions: 2012, 2013). Pakistan failed to qualify for the 2014 Hockey World Cup during this period after losing at the 2013 Hockey Asia Cup first time the team failed to qualify for the tournament in its history.

List of tours

Results

2010

2010 Series – Netherlands

2010 Hockey World Cup

2010 Sultan Azlan Shah Cup

2010 Triangular series

2010 Series – Netherlands

2010 Commonwealth Games

2010 Asian Games

2011

2011 Sultan Azlan Shah Cup

2011 UCD Four Nations

2011 Hockey RaboTrophy

International match – New Zealand

2011 Series – Belgium

2011 Series – Netherlands

2011 Asian Champions Trophy

Perth Tri Nations Challenge

2011 Hockey Champions Trophy

2012

2012 Sultan Azlan Shah Cup

International match – Belgium

2012 Series – Germany

Unofficial match – Netherlands

2012 Summer Olympics

2012 Hockey Champions Trophy

2012 Asian Champions Trophy

2013

2013 Sultan Azlan Shah Cup

2012–13 Hockey World League Semifinals

2013 Hockey Asia Cup

International match – Argentina

International match – Australia

2013 Asian Champions Trophy

2014

2014 Asian Games

2014 Hockey Champions Trophy

References 

Field hockey in Pakistan